The Awater Poëzieprijs (Dutch for Awater Poetry Prize) is a Dutch poetry award awarded by poetry magazine Awater. It was first awarded in 2008. The winner is chosen by professional poetry readers, such as critics and teachers, who are asked to submit their top three best new Dutch poetry collections of the past year. As such, the award is intended to reflect the industry's opinion.

The award ceremony is held at the end of the annual poetry week (Poëzieweek) organised by various organisations in the Netherlands and Flanders.

Winners 

 2008 - Tonnus Oosterhoff, Ware grootte
 2009 - Arjen Duinker, Buurtkinderen
 2010 - K. Michel, Bij eb is je eiland groter
 2011 - Anne Vegter, Eiland berg gletsjer
 2012 - Menno Wigman, Mijn naam is Legioen
 2013 - Mustafa Stitou, Tempel
 2014 - Alfred Schaffer, Mens dier ding
 2015 - Ilja Leonard Pfeijffer, Idyllen
 2016 - Eva Gerlach, Ontsnappingen
 2017 - Marije Langelaar,  Vonkt 
 2018 - Radna Fabias, Habitus
 2019 - Mischa Andriessen, Winterlaken
 2020 - Peter Verhelst, Zon
 2021 - Sasja Janssen, Virgula

References

External links 
 Awater Poëzieprijs

Dutch poetry awards
2008 establishments in the Netherlands
Awards established in 2008